New World is the second album led by drummer Joe Chambers recorded in 1976 and released on the short-lived Finite label.

Reception

The review for AllMusic stated "Chambers excels in hard bop, avant-garde, soul-jazz, and fusion contexts, and New World is proof positive of that fact."

Track listing
All compositions by Joe Chambers except as indicated
 "New World" - 8:32
 "Chung Dynasty" (Omar Clay) - 4:08
 "Rio" (Wayne Shorter) - 6:35
 "Blow Up" (Herbie Hancock) - 7:28
 "Rock Pile" - 5:56

Personnel
Joe Chambers - drums, marimba, vibraphone
Dick Meza - tenor saxophone, soprano saxophone
Eddie Martinez - electric piano 
Paul Metzke - guitar
Herb Bushler - bass 
Omar Clay - percussion
Ray Mantilla - congas, Latin percussion

References

1976 albums
Joe Chambers albums
Finite Records albums